Velikovo is a rural locality (a selo) in Novoselskoye Rural Settlement, Kovrovsky District, Vladimir Oblast, Russia. The population was 177 as of 2010.

Geography 
Velikovo is located on the Nerekhta River, 16 km south of Kovrov (the district's administrative centre) by road. Gorozhenovo is the nearest rural locality.

References 

Rural localities in Kovrovsky District